Samuel Moran (September 16, 1870 – August 27, 1897) was a professional baseball player. He was a pitcher for the Pittsburgh Pirates of the National League in August and September 1895.

Moran was playing for the Southern League's Nashville Seraphs when his contract was purchased by the Pirates on August 18, 1895. Earlier that season, he pitched in an exhibition against the National League's Cleveland Spiders. Moran earned the win for Nashville, out-dueling Cleveland's 28-year-old ace, Cy Young.

References

External links

1870 births
1897 deaths
Major League Baseball pitchers
Baseball players from New York (state)
Pittsburgh Pirates players
19th-century baseball players
Altoona Mud Turtles players
Lynchburg Hill Climbers players
Nashville Tigers players
Nashville Seraphs players
Toronto Canadians players
Albany Senators players
Batavia Giants players
Geneva Alhambras players
Sportspeople from Rochester, New York